Basketball was one of the 42 sports at the 16th Asian Games 2010 at Guangzhou, Guangdong, China. The event was held at the 13,000 seat Guangzhou International Sports Arena, Huangpu Gymnasium, Guangti Gymnasium, Ying Dong Gymnasium and Sports and Entertainment Centre.

China defeated Korea in both of the tournament's gold medal games; Iran won the men's bronze medal defeating Japan, and Japan defeated Chinese Taipei to win the bronze medal in the women's tournament.

Schedule

Medalists

Medal table

Draw
The teams were seeded based on their final ranking at the 2006 Asian Games.

Men
 Best 8 teams from the basketball competition of the 2006 Asian Games that are participating in 2010 directly entered the second round.

Qualifying round – Group A

 Athletes from Kuwait*

Qualifying round – Group B
*

Qualifying round – Group C

Qualifying round – Group D

Preliminary round – Group E
 (Host)
 (4)
 (5)
 (11)
1st Qualifying round – Group A
1st Qualifying round – Group C

Preliminary round – Group F
 (2)
 (3)
 (6)
 (8)
1st Qualifying round – Group B
1st Qualifying round – Group D

* The Philippines, which has made it to the latter stages of every Asian Games basketball tournament from 1951 to 2002, was originally drawn with Saudi Arabia but Saudi Arabia withdrew. Kuwait, which was originally drawn with Hong Kong and North Korea, was re-drawn with the Philippines to balance the number of teams in each group.

Women

Group A
 (Host)
 (4)

Group B
 (2)
 (3)

Final standing

Men

Women

References

External links
 Basketball results at the official website

 
Basketball
2010
International basketball competitions hosted by China
Asian
Asian